Auditory neuropathy spectrum disorder (ANSD) is a specific form of hearing loss defined by the presence of normal or near-normal otoacoustic emissions (OAEs) but the absence of normal middle ear reflexes and severely abnormal or completely absent auditory brainstem response (ABRs).

Individuals presenting with this recently recognised hearing loss appear to display sporadic windows of hearing and not. Very few (1 in 14) will go on to develop normal speech and language but with poor speech perception in background noise and in others, no speech perception and therefore language development is possible.

The condition was originally termed auditory neuropathy (AN)  and in 2001 as Auditory Neuropathy / Auditory Dys-synchrony (AN/AD)  (to include those cases where no true neuropathy was apparent). In 2008 at a meeting convened at Lake Como in Italy (Guidelines Development
Conference on the Identification and Management
of Infants with Auditory Neuropathy, International
Newborn Hearing Screening Conference, Como, Italy,
June 19–21, 2008), a group of leading authorities on the condition reached a consensus and renamed it as auditory neuropathy spectrum disorder.

See also 
Audiologist
Auditory brainstem response
Auditory neuropathy
Auditory processing disorder
Cochlear implant
Hearing aids
Otoacoustic emissions
Sensorineural hearing impairment

References

External links 
Alice's Story - A Blog Dedicated to a Beautiful Little Girl Who Has Ears That Need New Batteries

Hearing
Audiology